Tan Eng Yoon (9 January 1928 – 30 January 2010) was a Singaporean sprinter. He competed in the men's 100 metres at the 1956 Summer Olympics. In the triple jump event at the 1959 Southeast Asian Peninsular Games, he set a Singaporean record that lasted for 32 years. He later became the coach of the national team, and was the first President of the Singapore Olympians Association.

Tan died on 30 January 2010 after being hit by a car.

References

External links
 

1928 births
2010 deaths
Athletes (track and field) at the 1956 Summer Olympics
Singaporean male sprinters
Singaporean male triple jumpers
Olympic athletes of Singapore
Place of birth missing
Southeast Asian Games medalists in athletics
Southeast Asian Games gold medalists for Singapore
Athletes (track and field) at the 1958 British Empire and Commonwealth Games
Competitors at the 1959 Southeast Asian Peninsular Games
Commonwealth Games competitors for Singapore
Road incident deaths in Singapore
Pedestrian road incident deaths
20th-century Singaporean people